National Route 157 is a national highway of Japan connecting Kanazawa, Ishikawa and Gifu in Japan, with a total length of 202.6 km (125.89 mi).

References

157
Roads in Fukui Prefecture
Roads in Gifu Prefecture
Roads in Ishikawa Prefecture